Antonio Rukavina (born 26 January 1984) is a Serbian former professional footballer who played as a right-back.

Club career
Rukavina started out at his local club Bežanija, making his senior debuts in the 2002–03 season, as they won promotion to the Second League of Serbia and Montenegro. He also helped them win the 2005–06 Serbian First League, thus earning promotion to the Serbian SuperLiga.

In December 2006, it was announced that Partizan and Bežanija have agreed terms for the transfer of Rukavina and Žarko Lazetić. Both players signed four-year deals in January 2007. Under newly appointed manager Miroslav Đukić, Rukavina immediately established himself as a first team regular, scoring three league goals from 15 appearances in the second half of the 2006–07 season. He was subsequently named the team's captain ahead of the 2007–08 campaign.

In January 2008, Rukavina was transferred to German club Borussia Dortmund, penning a long-term contract. He made his Bundesliga debut in February of the same year, playing the full 90 minutes in a 3–3 away draw at MSV Duisburg. In February 2009, Rukavina moved on loan to 2. Bundesliga side 1860 Munich until the end of the season. He was permanently transferred to 1860 Munich in June 2009, with Sven Bender making the opposite move in lieu of a transfer fee.

In July 2012, Rukavina moved to Spain and signed with Valladolid, on a three-year deal, thus joining his countryman and former manager Miroslav Đukić. He made his La Liga debut in a 1–0 away win against Zaragoza that August, playing the whole match. In his two seasons at José Zorrilla, Rukavina collected 71 appearances and scored twice in the top flight of Spanish football.

On 8 July 2014, Rukavina signed a two-year contract for Villarreal. He collected 32 appearances in all competitions throughout his debut season with El Submarino Amarillo. In the next 2015–16 campaign, Rukavina appeared in 31 games, including 10 appearances in the UEFA Europa League.

In July 2018, Rukavina signed with Kazakh champions Astana on a free transfer. He helped them defend the league title in his first season. In August 2019, Rukavina extended his contract with the club until 2021. On 11 November 2021, Rukavina announced his retirement from football.

International career
Rukavina represented Serbia at the 2007 UEFA European Under-21 Championship. He was the team's first-choice right-back during the tournament, making four appearances in the process, as they finished as runners-up after losing 4–1 in the final to the Netherlands, the host nation.

On 2 June 2007, Rukavina made his full international debut for Serbia, playing the full 90 minutes of a 2–0 win away at Finland in a UEFA Euro 2008 qualifier. 

In June 2010, he was named in the final 23-man squad for the 2010 FIFA World Cup, but failed to make any appearances.

In June 2018, Serbia manager Mladen Krstajić included Rukavina in the final 23-man squad for the 2018 FIFA World Cup. He appeared in two games of the group stage, against Costa Rica and Brazil, as Serbia finished in third place.

Personal life
Rukavina's paternal great-grandmother was from Croatia.

Career statistics

Club

International

Honours
Bežanija
 Serbian First League: 2005–06
 Serbian League Belgrade: 2002–03

Borussia Dortmund
 German Supercup: 2008
 DFB-Pokal: runner-up 2007–08

Astana
 Kazakhstan Premier League: 2018, 2019
 Kazakhstan Super Cup: 2019

Serbia
 UEFA Under-21 Championship: runner-up 2007

References

External links

 
 
 
 
 
 

2. Bundesliga players
2010 FIFA World Cup players
2018 FIFA World Cup players
Association football defenders
Borussia Dortmund players
Bundesliga players
Expatriate footballers in Germany
Expatriate footballers in Kazakhstan
Expatriate footballers in Spain
FC Astana players
FK Bežanija players
FK Partizan players
Kazakhstan Premier League players
La Liga players
Real Valladolid players
Serbia international footballers
Serbia under-21 international footballers
Serbian expatriate footballers
Serbian expatriate sportspeople in Germany
Serbian expatriate sportspeople in Kazakhstan
Serbian expatriate sportspeople in Spain
Serbian footballers
Serbian SuperLiga players
Footballers from Belgrade
TSV 1860 Munich players
Villarreal CF players
1984 births
Living people
Serbian people of Croatian descent